Scotchman Lake is a natural lake in South Dakota, in the United States.

Scotchman Lake was named for the fact a local pioneer was a native of Scotland.

See also
List of lakes in South Dakota

References

Lakes of South Dakota
Bodies of water of Bennett County, South Dakota